Boris Dubrovin may refer to:

 Boris Dubrovin (mathematician)
 Boris Dubrovin (poet)